Deserts and xeric shrublands are a biome defined by the World Wide Fund for Nature. Deserts and xeric (ancient Greek xērós, “dry") shrublands form the largest terrestrial biome, covering 19% of Earth's land surface area. Ecoregions in this habitat type vary greatly in the amount of annual rainfall they receive, usually less than  annually except in the margins. Generally evaporation exceeds rainfall in these ecoregions. Temperature variability is also diverse in these lands. Many deserts, such as the Sahara, are hot year-round, but others, such as East Asia's Gobi, become quite cold during the winter.

Temperature extremes are a characteristic of most deserts. High daytime temperatures give way to cold nights because there is no insulation provided by humidity and cloud cover. The diversity of climatic conditions, though quite harsh, supports a rich array of habitats. Many of these habitats are ephemeral in nature, reflecting the paucity and seasonality of available water. Woody-stemmed shrubs and plants characterize vegetation in these regions. Above all, these plants have evolved to minimize water loss. Animal biodiversity is equally well adapted and quite diverse.

Degradation

Desertification

The conversion of productive drylands to desert conditions, known as desertification, can occur from a variety of causes. One is human intervention, including intensive agricultural tillage or overgrazing in areas that cannot support such exploitation. Climatic shifts such as global warming or the Milankovitch cycle (which drives glacials and interglacials) also affect the pattern of deserts on Earth.

Woody plant encroachment 

Xeric shrublands can experience woody plant encroachment, which is the thickening of bushes and shrubs at the expense of grasses. This process is often caused by unsustainable land management practices, such as overgrazing and fire suppression, but can also be a consequence of climate change. As a result, core ecosystem services of the shrublands are affected, including its biodiversity, productivity and groundwater recharge. Woody plant encroachment can be an expression of land degradation.

Ecoregions

The World Wide Fund for Nature highlights a number of desert ecoregions that have a high degree of biodiversity and endemism:
 The Nama Karoo of Namibia has the world's richest desert fauna.
 The Chihuahuan desert and Central Mexican matorral are the richest deserts in the Neotropics.
 The Carnarvon xeric shrublands of Australia are a regional center for endemism.
 The Sonoran and Baja deserts of Mexico are unusual desert communities dominated by giant columnar cacti.
 Madagascar spiny forests
 Atacama Desert

See also

  
  
  
  
  
  
  
 Xeriscaping — gardening or landscaping in xeric environments
 Xerocoles — animals adapted to xeric environments
 Xerophytes — plants adapted to xeric environments

References

External links
 Index to Deserts & Xeric Shrublands at bioimages.vanderbilt.edu
 Xeric World  Online community focused on the study of xeric plant species
 Desert Plants: List, Names and Adaptations

 
Terrestrial biomes
Flora of the California desert regions